Trent Simmons Shelton (born September 21, 1984) is a former American football wide receiver who is currently the founder and president of a Christian-based non-profit organization, RehabTime. During March 2009 Shelton started making two-minute videos to track his progress of bettering his life and would always end the videos with, "It's RehabTime." He was raised in Fort Worth, Texas, and wanted to become a professional football player when he grew up. He was signed by the Indianapolis Colts as an undrafted free agent in 2007. He played college football for Baylor.

Shelton has also been a member of the Seattle Seahawks, Indianapolis Colts and the Washington Redskins.

References

External links

Just Sports Stats
Seattle Seahawks bio
Washington Redskins bio

Baylor Bears football players
Indianapolis Colts players
Seattle Seahawks players
Washington Redskins players
Tulsa Talons players
1984 births
Living people